Margaret Kitchin (23 March 1914 – 16 June 2008) was a classical pianist, born in Switzerland but long resident in the United Kingdom. She was strongly associated with contemporary music and gave many premieres, including works by Michael Tippett, Iain Hamilton, Peter Racine Fricker, Alexander Goehr, Thea Musgrave, Priaulx Rainier, Elizabeth Maconchy, Don Banks, Eva Ruth Spalding, Alan Bush and Kenneth Leighton. She gave over 200 BBC recitals between 1949 and 1980.

External links
 Margaret Kitchin website
 Obituary: The Guardian
 Obituary: The Independent

1914 births
2008 deaths
Swiss classical pianists
Swiss women pianists
British classical pianists
British women pianists
20th-century classical pianists
20th-century British musicians
Women classical pianists
Swiss emigrants to the United Kingdom
20th-century women pianists